The Bellingham riots occurred on September 4, 1907, in Bellingham, Washington, United States. A mob of 400–500 white men, predominantly members of the Asiatic Exclusion League, with intentions to exclude Indian immigrants from the work force of the local lumber mills, attacked the homes of the South Asian Indians. The Indians were mostly Sikhs but were labelled as Hindus by much of the media of the day.

Events
The mob threw the East Indian workers into the streets, beat them, and pocketed their valuables. The authorities co-operated with the mob by corralling the beaten Indian immigrants into the City Hall, ostensibly for their safety. "By the next day 125 South Asians had been driven out of town and were on their way to British Columbia". According to one report, disputed by local leaders and newspapers, six East Indians were hospitalized; no one was killed.  About 100 were held overnight in the Bellingham jail, reportedly under "protective custody".  Although five men were arrested, they were later released and none of the participants in the mob violence were prosecuted.

Some victims of the riots migrated to Everett, Washington where two months later, they received similar treatment. Similar riots occurred during this period in Vancouver, BC and California.

Legacy
In recognition of the 100th anniversary of the riots, Whatcom County Executive Pete Kremen and Bellingham Mayor Tim Douglas jointly proclaimed Sept. 4, 2007, a "Day of Healing and Reconciliation," acknowledging and atoning for those regrettable events.
An imposing granite monument, the Arch of Healing and Reconciliation, was erected in downtown Bellingham and dedicated in 2018 in memory of the three groups of Asian immigrants who were expelled from the region - the Chinese in 1885, the Indians in 1907, and the Japanese in 1942.

See also
 Pacific Coast race riots of 1907
 Anti-Oriental Riots (Vancouver), Canadian riot that followed Bellingham
 List of incidents of civil unrest in the United States

References

Further reading
 Englesberg, Paul. "The 1907 Bellingham Riot and Anti-Asian Hostilities in the Pacific Northwest." online
 Hallberg, Gerald. N. "Bellingham, Washington's Anti-Hindu Riot." Journal of the West, 12 (1973): 163-175.
 Jensen, Joan M. Passage from India: Asian Indian Immigrants in North America (Yale University Press, 1988) 
Lee, Erika. "Hemispheric Orientalism and the 1907 Pacific Coast race riots." Amerasia Journal 33#2 (2007): 19-48.

External links
 Bellingham Riot materials in the South Asian American Digital Archive (SAADA)
 Echoes of Freedom: South Asian Pioneers in California, 1899-1965
 A Historical Perspective of Americans of Asian Indian Origin, 1790-1997
 The Racial Politics of Empire: South Asian Revolutionaries on the Pacific Coast

1907 riots
Asian-American culture in Washington (state)
Whatcom County, Washington
Anti-Indian sentiment in the United States
Asian-American riots in the United States
Indian-American history
Riots and civil disorder in Washington (state)
White American riots in the United States
History of Bellingham, Washington
1907 in Washington (state)
September 1907 events
Sikhism in the United States
Racially motivated violence against Asian-Americans